John Walsh is the former President of the Conservative Party of Canada. He was succeeded by Scott Lamb. Walsh has degrees in history and philosophy, political science and international relations, and law. His wife, Jillian, lives with him and his three children—Duncan, Liam, and Finnian—in Toronto where he is Director and General Counsel in the Investment Division of a Canadian Pension Fund. Prior to this, he had been a corporate lawyer for 10 years. He has also held senior positions for the Minister of National Defence, the Prime Minister and the Minister of Finance. Walsh is active in his church community and is a member of the Sick Kids Leaders Cabinet.

His son, John Rupert (Age 3), died in July 1997. His daughter, Georgia (Age 6), died in July 2014.

References 

American emigrants to Canada
Conservative Party of Canada politicians
Living people
People from Rochester, New York
Year of birth missing (living people)